The Far Rockaway Branch is an electrified rail line and service owned and operated by the Long Island Rail Road in the U.S. state of New York. The branch begins at Valley Interlocking, just east of Valley Stream station. From Valley Stream, the line heads south and southwest through southwestern Nassau County, ending at Far Rockaway in Queens, thus reentering New York City. LIRR maps and schedules indicate that the Far Rockaway Branch service continues west along the Atlantic Branch to Jamaica. This two-track branch provides all day service in both directions to Grand Central Madison and Penn Station, both in Midtown Manhattan

History

Opening 
The South Side Railroad (SSRLI) built the branch in 1869 under a subsidiary called the Far Rockaway Branch Railroad. While constructing it in summer 1869, the company installed about 700 feet (200 m) of tracks across William B. McManus's farmland near Lawrence. However, the transaction had not been completed, and McManus and some friends tore up the track the next night; after a legal battle, the company paid McManus. The same year, the South Side established a subsidiary named the Hempstead and Rockaway Railroad (H&R) designed to connect the line to the up-and-coming Southern Hempstead Branch. The H&R was dissolved in 1871.

Expansion 
Due to the success of the branch, the South Side built the 200-foot (60 m) South Side Pavilion, a restaurant on the beach at what is today Beach 30th Street. With an additional subsidiary known as the Rockaway Railway (1871-1872; Not to be confused with the Rockaway Village Railroad), the line was extended west to the Seaside House (Beach 103rd Street) in 1872 and Neptune House (Beach 116th Street) in 1875. The Far Rockaway Branch, along with the rest of the South Side Railroad, was acquired by the Long Island Rail Road in 1876.

Two stations on the branch were built as Arverne, both of which were built by Remington Vernam. The first of which was in 1888 at Gaston Avenue (Beach 67th Street). It had a large tower, was shaped like a Victorian hotel and had a connection to the Ocean Electric Railway, as did much of the Rockaway Beach and Far Rockaway branches. Due to a quarrel between the LIRR and Vernam, another Arverne Station was built at Straiton Avenue in 1892. From then on, the original Arverne station was known as Arverne-Gaston Avenue to distinguish it from the Arverne-Straiton Avenue.

In 1908, the line between Cedarhurst and Far Rockaway was triple-tracked. During the early 1940s, the right-of-way was relocated from a ground-level routing to a concrete trestle. The ROW crossed Mott Avenue in Far Rockaway and returned to ground level, passing over Nameoke Street, continuing to Gibson Station and ascending back on a trestle to Valley Stream.

End of Jamaica Bay service 
Frequent fires and maintenance problems, notably a May 23, 1950 fire between Broad Channel and The Raunt, led the LIRR to abandon the Queens portion of the route on October 3, 1955, which was acquired by the city to become the IND Rockaway Line, with service provided by the A train. Most Queens stations along the former Far Rockaway and Rockaway Beach Branches reopened as subway stations on June 28, 1956, the exception being Far Rockaway–Mott Avenue station, which was split between the NYCTA and LIRR on January 16, 1958.

Recent changes 
Between the late 1960s and 1990s, various stations along the Far Rockaway Branch were given high-level platforms in order to accommodate modern M1, M3, and M7 railcars.

The Far Rockaway Branch has the distinction of containing the oldest surviving railroad station on Long Island, and the only existing building constructed by an LIRR predecessor, specifically Hewlett. In 2003, the LIRR closed that station replacing it with a new one diagonally across the railroad crossing on Franklin Avenue; however, the original SSRLI Depot has remained intact.

Stations

Stations past Far Rockaway were abandoned in 1955, though many of them were reopened as subway stations on the IND Rockaway Line in 1956. The location of the former Atlantic Park station is uncertain.

References
Vincent F. Seyfried, The Long Island Rail Road: A Comprehensive History, Part One: South Side R.R. of L.I.,  1961

External links

MTA Long Island Rail Road
Far Rockaway Branch Stations (Unofficial LIRR History Website)
NYCSubway.org Far Rockaway Line
Far Rockaway Line; December 11, 1905 (Arrt's Arrchives)
Far Rockaway Branch (The LIRR Today)

Long Island Rail Road branches
Transportation in Nassau County, New York
Transportation in Queens, New York
Railroad lines in Rockaway, Queens
1869 establishments in New York (state)
Railway lines opened in 1869